The Beatles were an English rock band from Liverpool. With members John Lennon, Paul McCartney, George Harrison and Ringo Starr, the group is often considered the most influential band of the rock era. While active between 1960 and 1970, the group recorded hundreds of songs, with their "main catalogue" consisting of 213 songs, which include 188 originals and 25 covers. Since their break-up, a further 41 covers the Beatles recorded as a group have been released.

The Beatles

Solo

John Lennon

Paul McCartney

George Harrison

Ringo Starr

References

External links
 The Roots of the Beatles

 Covered
Beatles
Beatles